Gibberula atwoodae is a species of sea snail, a marine gastropod mollusk, in the family Cystiscidae. It is named after Canadian writer Margaret Atwood.

Description
The length of the shell attains 2.65 mm.

Distribution
This species occurs in Guadeloupe.

References

atwoodae
Gastropods described in 2015